Freddy Santos Ternero Corrales (March 26, 1962 – September 18, 2015) was a Peruvian football player and football manager. Ternero was the Mayor of District of San Martín de Porres in Lima, Peru for the periods of 2007–2010 and 2011–2014.

Playing career

Club
During his playing career Ternero played for several clubs in Peru, most notably Universitario de Deportes.

Managerial career
Ternero started his coaching career as assistant to Sergio Markarián at Universitario de Deportes. When Markarián resigned, Ternero was given his first opportunity to work as a club manager.

In 1994, he took over at Cienciano, helping the club to avoid relegation. In 1995, he also had a spell with Alianza Atlético.

Ternero was given his first chance to manage the Peru national team between 1996 and 1998, where Peru missed the 1998 FIFA World Cup by goal differences to Chile, following the humiliating 0–4 away loss.

After spells with FBC Melgar, Cienciano and Estudiantes de Medicina Ternero returned for a third spell as Cienciano manager in 2003. He led the club to the Copa Sudamericana 2003 championship and followed that with the Recopa Sudamericana in 2004. The first international titles ever won by a Peruvian club.

These successes earned him a second opportunity to work as the Peru national coach. Under his guidance they were victors of the Kirin Cup in 2005 with UAE. Ternero left the post after Peru failed to qualify for another FIFA World Cup, the 2006 FIFA World Cup.

Personal life

Death
Ternero died in September 2015 from liver cancer.

References

External links
 Statistics at DelGol

1962 births
2015 deaths
Footballers from Lima
Association football defenders
Peruvian footballers
Peruvian Primera División players
Club Universitario de Deportes footballers
León de Huánuco footballers
Cienciano footballers
Peruvian football managers
Peruvian Primera División managers
Club Universitario de Deportes managers
Cienciano managers
Alianza Atlético managers
1997 Copa América managers
Peru national football team managers
FBC Melgar managers
Mayors of places in Peru
Deaths from cancer in Peru
Deaths from liver cancer